A. J. Harmon (born January 5, 1989) is an American football offensive tackle for the Columbus Lions of the National Arena League (NAL). Harmon also played in the National Football League for the Kansas City Chiefs and the Seattle Seahawks in 2014. Harmon also played for the Tampa Bay Storm in 2014 as well. He played college football for the University of Georgia for two seasons, another season to Alabama State University before transferring to Cumberland University. Harmon is a member of Omega Psi Phi fraternity.

On February 6, 2017, Harmon signed with the Jacksonville Sharks. He signed with the Atlanta Havoc for the 2018 season.

References

External links
Rivals Sports
Tampa Bay Storm Bio
Georgia Bulldogs bio
Cumberland bio
Tampa Bay Storm
Pro football news

1989 births
Living people
People from Wadley, Georgia
Players of American football from Georgia (U.S. state)
American football offensive tackles
Georgia Bulldogs football players
Alabama State Hornets football players
Cumberland Phoenix football players
Kansas City Chiefs players
Cedar Rapids River Kings players
Jacksonville Sharks players
American Arena League players
Columbus Lions players